Death by Unga Bunga is a Norwegian garage rock band from Moss, Norway.

History
Death by Unga Bunga released their debut studio album in 2010 titled Juvenile Jungle. In 2012, the band released their second full-length album titled The Kids Are Up To No Good. In 2013, Death by Unga Bunga released their third full-length album titled You're An Animal in 2013. In 2016, Death by Unga Bunga released their fourth full-length album titled Pineapple Pizza. In September 2016, the band released an EP titled Fight!.

Band members
Sebastian Ulstad Olsen (lead vocals, guitar)
Preben S. Andersen (keyboards)
Stian S. Gulbrandsen (guitar)
Even Rolland Pettersen (bass)
Ole S. Nesset (drums)

Discography
Studio albums
Juvenile Jungle (Spoon Train Audio, 2010)
The Kids Are Up to No Good (Jansen Records, 2012)
You're an Animal (Jansen Records, 2013)
Pineapple Pizza (Jansen Records, 2016)
So Far So Good So Cool (Jansen Records, 2018)
Heavy Male Insecurity (Jansen Records, 2021)

References

Musical groups from Moss, Norway
Norwegian rock music groups
Musical groups established in 2010
2010 establishments in Norway